Caleta Chonos Formation is a geological formation of Oligocene age located around Chacao Channel in southern Chile. The formation overlies Bahía Mansa Metamorphic Complex and is overlain by the Ancud Volcanic Complex. It crops out in northwestern Chiloé Island in the isthmus of Lacuy Peninsula.

See also 
 Parga Formation
 Lacui Formation

References 

Geologic formations of Chile
Oligocene Series of South America
Paleogene Chile
Conglomerate formations
Sandstone formations
Coal formations
Coal in Chile
Tuff formations
Geology of Los Lagos Region
Chiloé Archipelago